Ivan Yuen Chee Wern (born 15 September 1990), known as Ivan Yuen, is a professional squash player from Malaysia. He reached a career-high world ranking of World No. 40 in March 2017.

References

External links 
 
 
 
  (2014)

1990 births
Living people
Malaysian male squash players
Malaysian people of Chinese descent
Asian Games medalists in squash
Asian Games gold medalists for Malaysia
Asian Games silver medalists for Malaysia
Squash players at the 2010 Asian Games
Squash players at the 2014 Asian Games
Squash players at the 2018 Asian Games
Medalists at the 2010 Asian Games
Medalists at the 2014 Asian Games
Medalists at the 2018 Asian Games
Commonwealth Games competitors for Malaysia
Squash players at the 2010 Commonwealth Games
Squash players at the 2014 Commonwealth Games
Squash players at the 2018 Commonwealth Games
Competitors at the 2017 World Games
Sportspeople from Kuala Lumpur
Sportspeople from Penang
20th-century Malaysian people
21st-century Malaysian people